Portage Road in the Ōtāhuhu suburb of Auckland, New Zealand, follows the path of Te Tō Waka, one of the Māori canoe portages between the Tāmaki River (an arm of the Hauraki Gulf) and the Manukau Harbour, which facilitated access between the eastern and western sides of the North Island. The history of the site is described in a plaque that is embedded in a concrete plinth at the intersection of Portage Road and Great South Road. The road marked the northernmost boundary of the Borough of Otahuhu until it was absorbed into the new City of Tamaki, then later on, Auckland City and Auckland Region.

Plaque on Portage Road 
An historic plaque can be found on Portage Road. The plaque is inscribed as follows:

References 

Streets in Auckland
Māngere-Ōtāhuhu Local Board Area